Merchants and Thieves is the third studio album by Scottish pop singer Sandi Thom, released on 17 May 2010. The album was released through Thom's own record label 'Guardian Angels' after being dropped by her former label Sony BMG.

Background and release
Thom's third studio album Merchants and Thieves was released  on 17 May 2010 with "This Ol' World" as the lead single. The album was published by Thom on her own "Guardian Angels" label, which she formed after being dropped by RCA.  Musically it moves from pop folk towards blues and roots. The album entered the UK official chart at 118 on its first week of release before dropping out of the top 200. The single was made available as a download-only release in April 2010.

A second single "Gold Dust" (smoking gun remix) was released as a download-only in July 2010  but failed to enter the official UK Chart. A deluxe edition with extra tracks and video of the single "Gold Dust" was released as a download in February 2011.This was followed by a physical release made available on Thoms website Thom's cover version of the classic track "House of the Rising Sun" was released as a download-only single and extra track on the deluxe edition of the album. It was also given away as a free download to readers of the Scottish Mail newspaper.  The album was nominated for Best Album in the British Blues Awards 2011.

The album was nominated for Best Jazz/Blues Recording of the Year in the Scottish Music Awards. Thom was also nominated for Artist of the Year and her label "Guardian Angel Recordings" was nominated for Record Label of the Year.

Reception
"Merchants and Thieves" received a positive review by The Scotsman: "Musically, she struts a good game... The challenge will be to convince others that she was 'born in the belly of the blues'".

Track listing

Singles
"This Ol' World" which features blues musician Joe Bonamassa was released as the album's lead single in April 2010.

"Gold Dust" (smoking gun remix) was released in July 2010

Awards and nominations
The album was nominated for Best Jazz/Blues Recording of the Year in the Scottish Music Awards. Thom was also nominated for Artist of the Year and her label "Guardian Angel Recordings" was nominated for Record Label of the Year.

Chart performance

Release history
 United Kingdom - 17 May 2010
 Europe - 17 May 2010
 United States - 18 May 2010

References

Sandi Thom albums
2010 albums